Clarence Stephen Johnson (born November 3, 1957) is an American former professional basketball player who played in the National Basketball Association (NBA). He played the power forward and center positions.

Collegiate career
Johnson played collegiately at Oregon State University under Naismith Hall of Fame coach Ralph Miller. He was the star player on the 1980–81 team (known as the Orange Express) which reached as high as no. 1 in the national rankings, before being upset in the second round of the 1981 NCAA Division I Basketball Tournament by eighth-seeded Kansas State. That season, Johnson made 235 of 315 field goals for a field goal percentage of .746, a single-season mark which was an NCAA men's basketball record until March 16, 2017, when Devontae Cacok of UNCW finished with a field goal percentage of .800 of 230 shots.

Professional career
He was drafted the following summer, with the seventh pick overall, by the Kansas City Kings in the 1981 NBA draft, and played with the Kings from 1981 to 1984 before being traded to the Chicago Bulls. After a season and a half with the Bulls, Johnson played one season with the San Antonio Spurs. While with the Spurs, Johnson led the league in field goal percentage at .632 one of the highest in NBA history.

During the 1986 off-season, Johnson was traded to the Portland Trail Blazers for longtime Portland's fixture Mychal Thompson; the team intended to start Johnson at power forward alongside defensive-minded center Sam Bowie. Five games into the season, however, Bowie suffered a broken leg (one of many such injuries he would endure in his ill-fated career), and Johnson was moved to the starting center role, with aging veteran Caldwell Jones replacing him at power forward. Only a couple games later, on November 26, 1986, Johnson scored a career-best 40 points, while also grabbing 10 rebounds, during a 118–114 loss to the Cleveland Cavaliers. That year, Johnson enjoyed his best season, averaging nearly 17 points per game, while averaging a .555 field goal percentage.

The next season, Bowie again broke his leg, and Johnson assumed the starting center position. Unfortunately for him, he would himself be injured, and was replaced in the lineup by Kevin Duckworth, whose stellar play earned him the job permanently. Nevertheless, Johnson earned a selection on the West All-Star team, but was unable to play due to injury. An attempt to start both players in a dual-post configuration, and the Johnson/Duckworth controversy was one of several which distracted the team in the 1988–89 season (which led to a losing record and a first-round playoff sweep). After that season, the rather unhappy Johnson was left unprotected in the 1989 NBA expansion draft, and was selected by the Minnesota Timberwolves. Johnson, unhappy with being drafted by an expansion team, played only four games for the Timberwolves before being traded to the Seattle SuperSonics; he played only 21 games for Seattle that season. He played 24 games for the Golden State Warriors the following year; and retired at the conclusion of the 1990–91 season.

Johnson holds the NCAA single season and career records for field goal percentage. He led the NBA in personal fouls during the 1981–82 and 1986–87 seasons, and led the NBA in disqualifications during the 1981–82, 1985–86, and 1986–87 seasons.

Personal life
Johnson, who retired from playing and permanently settled in Portland, now works with an organization called The Best of Yachting and is an investor in business in the area.

NBA career statistics

Regular season

|-
| style="text-align:left;"|
| style="text-align:left;"|Kansas City
| 78 || 50 || 22.3 || .613 ||  || .642 || 5.9 || 1.2 || .5 || 1.1 || 12.8
|-
| style="text-align:left;"|
| style="text-align:left;"|Kansas City
| 79 || 21 || 19.5 || .624 ||  || .574 || 5.0 || 1.2 || .5 || 1.1 || 11.7
|-
| style="text-align:left;"|
| style="text-align:left;"|Kansas City
| 50 || 12 || 17.9 || .553 ||  || .571 || 5.0 || 1.3 || .4 || 1.0 || 9.6
|-
| style="text-align:left;"|
| style="text-align:left;"|Chicago
| 31 || 9 || 19.2 || .571 ||  || .582 || 5.4 || .6 || .5 || .7 || 9.4
|-
| style="text-align:left;"|
| style="text-align:left;"|Chicago
| 74 || 54 || 22.4 || .545 || .000 || .718 || 5.9 || .9 || .5 || .8 || 10.0
|-
| style="text-align:left;"|
| style="text-align:left;"|San Antonio
| 71 || 55 || 25.7 || style="background:#cfecec;"|.632* ||  || .694 || 6.5 || 1.3 || .6 || .9 || 13.8
|-
| style="text-align:left;"|
| style="text-align:left;"|Portland
| 79 || 74 || 29.7 || .556 ||  || .698 || 7.2 || 2.0 || .6 || 1.0 || 16.8
|-
| style="text-align:left;"|
| style="text-align:left;"|Portland
| 43 || 33 || 24.4 || .529 || .000 || .586 || 5.6 || 1.3 || .4 || .7 || 15.4
|-
| style="text-align:left;"|
| style="text-align:left;"|Portland
| 72 || 11 || 20.5 || .524 ||  || .527 || 5.0 || 1.5 || .3 || .6 || 10.0
|-
| style="text-align:left;"|
| style="text-align:left;"|Minnesota
| 4 || 0 || 4.3 || .000 ||  ||  || .8 || .3 || .0 || .0 || .0
|-
| style="text-align:left;"|
| style="text-align:left;"|Seattle
| 21 || 0 || 11.5 || .533 ||  || .600 || 2.4 || .8 || .1 || .2 || 5.6
|-
| style="text-align:left;"|
| style="text-align:left;"|Golden State
| 24 || 8 || 9.5 || .540 ||  || .595 || 2.4 || .7 || .2 || .2 || 3.8
|- class="sortbottom"
| style="text-align:center;" colspan="2"|Career
| 626 || 327 || 21.8 || .572 || .000 || .634 || 5.5 || 1.2 || .5 || .8 || 11.7

Playoffs

|-
| style="text-align:left;"|1985
| style="text-align:left;”|Chicago
| 3 || 0 || 7.3 || .286 ||  || 1.000 || 1.7 || .7 || .0 || .0 || 2.0
|-
| style="text-align:left;"|1986
| style="text-align:left;”|San Antonio
| 3 || 0 || 17.7 || .333 ||  || .455 || 2.0 || .7 || .0 || .3 || 5.0
|-
| style="text-align:left;"|1987
| style="text-align:left;”|Portland
| 4 || 4 || 34.3 || .459 ||  || .628 || 10.0 || .5 || .5 || .3 || 20.8
|-
| style="text-align:left;"|1989
| style="text-align:left;”|Portland
| 3 || 0 || 11.3 || .250 ||  || 1.000 || 2.0 || .0 || .7 || .0 || 2.3
|- class="sortbottom"
| style="text-align:center;" colspan="2"| Career
| 13 || 4 || 18.9 || .407 ||  || .627 || 4.4 || .5 || .3 || .2 || 8.5

References

External links

1957 births
Living people
20th-century African-American sportspeople
21st-century African-American people
African-American basketball players
All-American college men's basketball players
American men's basketball players
Basketball players from Akron, Ohio
Centers (basketball)
Chicago Bulls players
Golden State Warriors players
Kansas City Kings draft picks
Kansas City Kings players
Minnesota Timberwolves expansion draft picks
Minnesota Timberwolves players
National Basketball Association All-Stars
Oregon State Beavers men's basketball players
Portland Trail Blazers players
Power forwards (basketball)
San Antonio Spurs players
Seattle SuperSonics players